Stadtlauringen is a municipality in the district of Schweinfurt in Bavaria, Germany.

Geography

Location 
Stadtlauringen is in the Main Rhön region, circa 20 kilometers north east of Schweinfurt. It is the northernmost municipality in the district of Schweinfurt.
The Lauer flows through it. The Ellertshäuser See is close to the village Altenmünster.

Towns and Villages 
The municipality Stadtlauringen consists of the following towns and villages:

Altenmünster with Ellertshausen and Reinhardshausen
Ballingshausen
Birnfeld
Fuchsstadt
Mailes
Oberlauringen
Stadtlauringen
Sulzdorf
Wettringen
Wetzhausen

History 
In 794 A.D. it was first documented as Lauringen, then later as Niederlauringen.
In 1484 it received municipality and city rights, and was also renamed to Stadtlauringen.
In 1818 city rights were abandoned, but municipality rights were kept.

The coat of arms originates from the time when city rights were acquired.

Politics

Mayor 
Mayor is Friedel Heckenlauer (CSU), in office since 2002.

Sources 
 Reinhold W. F. Heusinger: Markt Stadtlauringen. Beiträge zur Heimatgeschichte. Markt Stadtlauringen, Stadtlauringen 1994.

References

Schweinfurt (district)